Blaincourt-lès-Précy (literally Blaincourt near Précy) is a commune in the Oise department in northern France.

Population

See also
Communes of the Oise department

References

Communes of Oise